Khaneqah is a village in Balkh Province in northern Afghanistan.

It is located near the border with Turkmenistan.

See also 
Balkh Province

References

External links 
Satellite map at Maplandia.com 

Populated places in Balkh Province